Casanova is an operetta in three acts by Ralph Benatzky with music by Johann Strauss II and the libretto by Rudolph Schanzer and Ernst Welisch. Its first performance was on 1 September 1928 at the Großes Schauspielhaus in Berlin.

Casanova was one of a series of spectacular "revue-operettas" Benatzky wrote for producer and revue director Erik Charell at the Großes Schauspielhaus. The star-studded original cast of Casanova included Michael Bohnen, the well-known opera bass-baritone in the title role, Anni Frind, Anny Ahlers, Paul Morgan, and Siegfried "Sig" Arno. La Jana was a dancer, and the Comedian Harmonists appeared there with enormous success.

References

External links
 Record details of "Nun's Chorus Casanova" by Anni Frind, soprano on 45cat.com

German-language operettas
Compositions set in Austria
1928 musicals
Operas by Ralph Benatzky
Compositions by Johann Strauss II
Operas